Billy Bathgate is a 1991 American biographical gangster film directed by Robert Benton, starring Loren Dean as the title character and Dustin Hoffman as real-life gangster Dutch Schultz. The film co-stars Nicole Kidman, Steven Hill, Steve Buscemi, and Bruce Willis. Although Billy is a fictional character, at least four of the other characters in the film were real people. The screenplay was adapted by British writer Tom Stoppard from E.L. Doctorow's 1989 novel of the same name. Doctorow distanced himself from the film for the extensive deviations from the book. It received negative reviews and was a box office bomb, grossing a mere $15.5 million against its $48 million budget.

Plot
Billy Behan (Loren Dean) is a poor Irish American teenager from the Bronx in the 1920s. One day, he catches the attention of wealthy Jewish mobster Dutch Schultz (Dustin Hoffman). Changing his last name to Bathgate after a local street, Billy goes to work for Schultz's organization, serving mostly as a gofer for Schultz himself. Billy is present when Schultz personally commits two brutal murders: his trusted lieutenant, Bo Weinberg (Bruce Willis), who Schultz believes betrayed him after learning that Weinberg has been secretly meeting with rival bosses, is dumped in the water wearing cement shoes, and his top enforcer, "Big" Julie Martin (Mike Starr), is personally shot dead by Dutch for stealing $50,000 from the organization's accounts and defiantly stating that he's "entitled" to it. Despite this, Billy comes to see Schultz as a father figure and the mob as his chance to make it big.

Facing criminal charges of tax evasion in a court in upstate New York, Schultz brings his entourage, including Billy and his mistress Drew Preston (Nicole Kidman) (who was previously Bo's mistress), along as he temporarily moves into the local community. He successfully charms the residents, presenting himself as good natured and easygoing while doing many charitable acts, even faking conversion to Catholicism. While Dutch is attending his trial, Billy is assigned to watch Drew. His loyalties to Schultz are tested as he begins falling in love with the flirtatious Drew. Realizing that Dutch intends to have Drew murdered for cheating on him, Billy is able to get in contact with her real husband, wealthy  Harvey (Xander Berkeley), who manages to take Drew home, whisking her out of harm's way on a private plane before Schultz's men can make their move.

Despite being acquitted by a sympathetic jury, Dutch is soon indicted again. After running into difficulties paying for his legal defense, he decides to have state prosecutor Thomas E. Dewey assassinated; this request is denied by the mob's governing authority, the Commission, out of fear that killing Dewey will bring too much heat onto the Mafia. Schultz sends Billy to bribe a member of the Commission, but the bribe is rejected. When Billy returns with the bad news, Schultz angrily blames him for not doing enough and Billy is fired by Schultz's right-hand man, Otto Berman (Steven Hill), who, seemingly foreseeing doom ahead for the out of control Schultz, lets him keep the bribe money as a gift. As Billy leaves, he is ambushed and beaten by gangsters working for Commission head Lucky Luciano (Stanley Tucci) and is then forced to watch as Luciano's men storm Dutch’s safe haven restaurant where he is dining; Dutch, Berman, and his  two henchmen  are swiftly gunned down. Billy is taken to meet Luciano, who tells him that he knows where Billy's family lives if he ever speaks of what happened to Dutch, before letting him go along with his envelope of cash.

Cast
 Dustin Hoffman as Arthur "Dutch Schultz" Flegenheimer
 Nicole Kidman as Drew Preston
 Loren Dean as Billy "Bathgate" Behan
 Bruce Willis as Bo Weinberg
 Steven Hill as Otto Berman
 Stanley Tucci as Charlie "Lucky" Luciano
 Mike Starr as Jules "Big Julie" Martin
 Steve Buscemi as Irving Nitzberg
 John Costelloe as Bernard "Lulu" Rosenkrantz
 Billy Jaye as Mickey Marks 
 Timothy Jerome as Dixie Davis
 Stephen Joyce as James Joseph Hines
 Robert F. Colesberry as Jack Kelly
 Frances Conroy as Mary Behan, Billy's Mother
 Moira Kelly as Becky
 Kevin Corrigan as Arnold
 Xander Berkeley as Harvey Preston
 Barry McGovern as Father McInerny
 Terry Loughlin as Mr. Chambers
 Paul Herman as Dutch's Thug
 Jack Mulcahy as Fire Inspector (uncredited)
 Katharine Haughton as Charlotte

Production
The film was shot in Hamlet, North Carolina and Saratoga Springs, New York.

Reception

Critical response
On Rotten Tomatoes the film has an approval rating of 36% based on 25 reviews. Audiences polled by CinemaScore gave the film an average grade of "C+" on an A+ to F scale.

Variety wrote: "This refined, intelligent drama about thugs appeals considerably to the head but has little impact in the gut, which is not exactly how it should be with gangster films." Roger Ebert of the Chicago Sun-Times gave it 2 out of 4 and wrote: "Billy Bathgate cost a lot of money to make, they say, but it's not there on the screen."

Box office

The movie debuted at No. 4 and underperformed against its $48 million budget.

Accolades
Nicole Kidman was nominated for a Golden Globe Award for Best Supporting Actress.

References

External links 
 
 

1990s crime drama films
1990s English-language films
1991 crime films
1991 drama films
1991 films
American crime drama films
Cultural depictions of Dutch Schultz
Cultural depictions of Lucky Luciano
Films about Jewish-American organized crime
Films based on American novels
Films directed by Robert Benton
Films scored by Mark Isham
Films set in the 1930s
Films shot in New Jersey
Films shot in New York (state)
Films shot in North Carolina
Films shot in South Carolina
Films with screenplays by Tom Stoppard
Touchstone Pictures films
1990s American films